Alan Blackburn (4 August 1935 – January 2014) was an English footballer. He played outside-left professionally for West Ham United and Halifax Town between 1954 and 1961, making a total of 139 Football League appearances. Blackburn died in January 2014.

References

1935 births
2014 deaths
People from Mansfield District
Footballers from Nottinghamshire
English footballers
Association football outside forwards
West Ham United F.C. players
Halifax Town A.F.C. players
Margate F.C. players
Telford United F.C. players
English Football League players